Krika is a village situated in Klippan Municipality, Skåne County, Sweden with 208 inhabitants in 2005.

References 

Populated places in Klippan Municipality
Populated places in Skåne County